Norway competed at the 2020 Summer Paralympics in Tokyo, Japan, from 25 August to 6 September 2020.

Medalists

Competitors

Athletics 

Salum Ageze Kashafali qualified to represent Norway after winning the gold medal in the men's 100 metres T12 event at the 2019 World Para Athletics Championships held in Dubai, United Arab Emirates.

Badminton

Equestrian 

Norway sent one athlete after qualified.

Rowing

Norway qualified one boat in the women's single sculls for the games by winning the gold medal at the 2019 World Rowing Championships in Ottensheim, Austria and securing one of seventh available place.

Qualification Legend: FA=Final A (medal); FB=Final B (non-medal); R=Repechage

Shooting

Norway entered four athletes into the Paralympic competition. All of them successfully break the Paralympic qualification at the 2019 WSPS World Championships which was held in Sydney, Australia.

Swimming 

Sarah Louise Rung and Andreas Skaar Bjornstad qualified to represent Norway at the 2020 Summer Paralympics. But Norway qualified one more to represent.

Table tennis

Norway entered three players into the table tennis competition at the games. Tommy Urhaug and Aida Dahlen qualified via World Ranking allocation and Nora Korneliussen who won a gold medal at the World Qualification Tournament.

Men

See also 
 Norway at the Paralympics
 Norway at the 2020 Summer Olympics

References

External links 
 2020 Summer Paralympics website

Nations at the 2020 Summer Paralympics
2020
Summer Paralympics